Dorcadion bremeri is a species of beetle in the family Cerambycidae. It was described by Breuning in 1981.

References

bremeri
Beetles described in 1981